Vision Thing is the third studio album by English gothic rock band the Sisters of Mercy. It was released on 22 October 1990 through Merciful Release and East West Records, with Elektra Records handling the US release.

Recording
Soon after the release of the band's previous album, Floodland, Eldritch approached guitarist John Perry to join them on writing a new album. After Perry turned down the offer to become a full-time member, the band began to search for a new guitarist through their record label. Eventually, Eldritch was forwarded a demo tape by young and unknown Andreas Bruhn. Bruhn was called to audition a week after turning in his tape.

As the band—now composed of Eldritch, Bruhn and bassist Patricia Morrison—was about to enter the studio, Morrison was abruptly replaced by the former Sigue Sigue Sputnik member Tony James. As Perry recalls, "When I first heard the Vision Thing material, Patricia was there; when I did the album, she wasn't." While details on Morrison parting ways with the band have never been fully disclosed, she herself was allegedly hired by Eldritch on the day her predecessor, Craig Adams, resigned.

Morrison later confirmed to have worked with Eldritch up until December 1989. She would go on to say her resignation was linked to her monthly salary of £300, and that she had her doubts on the band's musical direction. "I wasn't too thrilled with the direction the record was going in. There were elements I didn't like that could have gone either way, and now that Tony James is in I want nothing to do with it. It seems obvious what's going on – it's scam time..."

While Morrison's recording input on Floodland has been contested, Perry raised doubts whether either she or James play on Vision Thing. "By the time of the recording, Tony James was in, but I'm not sure either [he or Patricia] actually played any bass on the record – sounds sequenced to me." James has later admitted his parts took some twenty minutes in total to record.

Ultimately, the band spent nine months in the Danish recording facilities, with guitarist Tim Bricheno recruited during the final two weeks. Then-manager Boyd Steemson followed suit at one point to observe the progress. "I remember flying out to the [Puk] studio when they were making Vision Thing, and Tony [James] spoke to me and said: 'Well, I guess it's going to be a five-song album.' And I said, 'No, it will not be a five-song album.' Two days later they had seven-and-a-half songs. It was a very painful process."

According to the official website of the band, the final mixes were not the ones worked on the most. "'Vision Thing' is a stripped-down affair. Half of the finished mixes for the album are shelved in favour of rough mixes from earlier stages of the recording session, 'monitor mixes' which retain the immediate feel of the songs."

Content
The album was designed by songwriter and singer Andrew Eldritch as an attack on the policies of the George H. W. Bush administration (the title comes from an oft-cited quote by Bush).

Legacy
Described by Andrew Eldritch as "a fine album", it was included by Q magazine on their "Fifty Best Albums of 1990" list. In 1999, Ned Raggett ranked the album at number 69 on his list of "The Top 136 or So Albums of the Nineties".

Track listing
All songs produced by Eldritch, except "More", produced by Eldritch and Jim Steinman, and "When You Don't See Me", produced by Chris Tsangarides.

2006 reissue
Along with the group's previous two releases, Vision Thing was reissued in November 2006 with bonus tracks.

Personnel
Andrew Eldritch – vocals, guitars, keyboards
Tim Bricheno – guitars
Andreas Bruhn – guitars
Tony James – bass
Doktor Avalanche (drum machine) – drums

Guest musicians
John Perry – guitars, slide guitar on "Detonation Boulevard"
Maggie Reilly – backing vocals on "Vision Thing", "More", "Detonation Boulevard", "Something Fast" and "Doctor Jeep"

Charts

Weekly charts

Year-end charts

Certifications

References

1990 albums
Albums produced by Andy Zax
Albums produced by Chris Tsangarides
Albums produced by Jim Steinman
East West Records albums
Merciful Release albums
The Sisters of Mercy albums